Yerykla may refer to:
Yerykla, Alexeyevsky District, Republic of Tatarstan, a village (selo) in the Alexeyevsky District of the Republic of Tatarstan, Russia
Yerykla, Nurlatsky District, Republic of Tatarstan, a village (selo) in the Nurlatsky District of the Republic of Tatarstan, Russia